John Tibar George (born 1 January 2000) is a Tanzanian footballer plays for Masfout as a midfielder.

Career statistics

Club

Notes

References

2000 births
Living people
Tanzanian footballers
Association football midfielders
UAE Pro League players
UAE First Division League players
Singida United F.C. players
MFK Vyškov players
Baniyas Club players
Masfout Club players
Expatriate footballers in the Czech Republic
Expatriate footballers in the United Arab Emirates
Tanzanian expatriate sportspeople in the Czech Republic
Tanzanian expatriate sportspeople in the United Arab Emirates
Tanzanian Premier League players